Like all municipalities of Puerto Rico, Aibonito is subdivided into administrative units called barrios, which are roughly comparable to minor civil divisions. The barrios and subbarrios, in turn, are further subdivided into smaller local populated place areas/units called sectores (sectors in English). The types of sectores may vary, from normally sector to urbanización to reparto to barriada to residencial, among others. Some sectors appear in two barrios.

List of sectors by barrio

Aibonito barrio-pueblo

 Pueblo Norte
 Pueblo Sur
Urbanización Buena Vista

Algarrobo
Carretera 717
Sector Húcares
Sector Subida

Asomante
Alturas de Asomante
Comunidad Asomante
Estancias Asomante
Hogar Dulce Vida
Lomas de Aibonito
Parcelas Cuadritos
Parcelas Emanuelli
Sector Bejucos
Sector Cristian Belén
Sector El Cerro
Sector El Nueve
Sector Esparra
Sector Las Abejas
Sector Los Llanos
Sector Los Cuadritos
Sector Los Mangós
Sector Los Ranchetes
Sector Los Reyes
Sector Sabana
Sector Serrallés
Sector Subida Asomante
Urbanización Jatibonito
Urbanización Mansiones de Asomante
Urbanización Praderas de Aibonito
Urbanización Praderas de Asomante

Caonillas
Desvío Robles
La Vega
Parcelas Nuevas
Parcelas Viejas
Sector Bambúa
Sector Bejucos
Sector Corea
Sector El Coquí
Sector Escuelas
Sector La Tea
Sector Quenepo
Sector Verdún

Cuyón
Carretera 162
Carretera 716
Cuyón I y II
Sector Boquerón
Sector El Fresar
Sector Gallardo Abajo
Sector Jagüeyes
Sector Ratones
Sector Rincón
Sector Vertero

Llanos
Barriada San Luis
Barrio Caonillas Oeste
Barrio Llanos Carretera
Barrio Llanos Rural Adentro
Carretera 162
Carretera 725
Estancias del Llano
Extensión San Luis
Panoramas Aibonito
Parcelas Nuevas
Paseo Lajita
Reparto Quiñones
Residencial Golden Village
Residencial Villa de la Rosa
Sector El Cerro
Sector El Juicio
Sector El Patio
Sector La Españolita
Sector Las Abejas
Sector Loma del Viento
Sector Los Llanos
Sector Mondragón
Sector Paseo Los Pinos
Sector Saturnino
Sector Toronjo
Sector Usabón
Urbanización Colinas del Paraíso
Urbanización Colinas de San Francisco
Urbanización Santa Ana

Pasto
Carretera 162
Carretera 718
Comunidad Monte Verde
Comunidad Yura
Hacienda Camila
Parcelas Nuevas
Parcelas Viejas
Sector Bejuco
Sector Cuchilla
Sector Cuesta Blanca
Sector La Playita
Sector La Torre
Sector Los Cardín
Sector Palomas
Sector Pasto
Urbanización Las Delicias
Urbanización Paseo de Algarrobo
Urbanización Paseo de la Reina
Villas de Algarrobo

Plata
Carretera 727
Carretera 728
La Tuca
Sector Amoldaderos
Sector Empalme
Sector Escuelas
Sector Fraternidad
Sector Hoyo Frío
Sector Hoyo Oscura
Sector La Calle
Sector La Cantera
Sector La Parada
Sector Los Chorritos
Sector Los Muros
Sector Naguita
Urbanización Paseo del Plata
Urbanización Valle de la Plata

Robles
Barrio Robles Centro
Calle Mercedita Serrallés
Carretera 722
Condominio Casa Aibonito
Desvío Robles
Extensión Bella Vista
Extensión San José
Hogar Aurora
Parcelas Rabanal
Poblado Muñoz Rivera
Reparto Robles
Residencial Liborio Ortiz
Residencial Villa Verde
Ruta Panorámica 7722
Sector Campito
Sector Concretera
Sector El Castillo
Sector La Base
Sector La Ceiba
Sector La Loma
Sector Mameyes
Sector Manresa
Sector Pangola
Sector Rabanal
Sector Represa
Sector Sierra
Tramo Calle San José (Carretera 14)
Urbanización Bella Vista
Urbanización Brisas de Aibonito
Urbanización Buena Vista
Urbanización Campo Rey
Urbanización La Providencia (Pangola)
Urbanización Las Flores
Urbanización Las Mercedes
Urbanización Las Quintas
Urbanización Monte Carlo
Urbanización San José
Urbanización Villa Coquí
Urbanización Villa Rosales
Villa Panorámica

See also

 List of communities in Puerto Rico

References

Aibonito
Aibonito